Teterton is an unincorporated community located in Pendleton County, West Virginia, United States. Teterton lies within the Monongahela National Forest.

The community was named after the local Teter family.

References

Unincorporated communities in Pendleton County, West Virginia
Unincorporated communities in West Virginia